Metastatia is a genus of moths in the subfamily Arctiinae. The genus was erected by Arthur Gardiner Butler in 1876.

Species
 Metastatia azurea Lathy, 1899
 Metastatia pyrrhorhoea Hübner, 1827

References

External links

Arctiinae